Political Affairs Committee may refer to:

Political Affairs Committee (African Union), a committee of the African Union
Political Affairs Committee (British Guiana), a political party in British Guiana